Sarner or Särner may refer to
Sarner Aa (river) in Switzerland
Craig Sarner (born 1949), American ice hockey forward
Klas Särner (1891–1980), Swedish gymnast